Kovalivka (pronounced either Kovalevka or Kovalëvka) is a village in Ukraine, Odesa Raion, Odesa Oblast. It belongs to Usatove rural hromada, one of the hromadas of Ukraine, and is one of the 15 villages in the hromada. It has a population of about 217.

Until 18 July 2020, Kovalivka belonged to Biliaivka Raion. The raion was abolished in July 2020 as part of the administrative reform of Ukraine, which reduced the number of raions of Odesa Oblast to seven. The area of Biliaivka Raion was merged into Odesa Raion.

Population Census 

As of the 1989 Ukrainian Population Census, Kovalivka had a population of 241; 114 men, and 127 women.

As of the 2001 Ukrainian Population Census, Kovalivka has a population of 222 (19 fewer people than 1989).

References

Villages in Odesa Raion
Usatove Hromada